The Camp Rice Formation is a geologic formation in west Texas and southern New Mexico. It preserves fossils of the Pliocene-Pleistocene. These include the distinctive Tonuco Mountain Local Fauna.

Description
The formation consists of poorly cemented sandstone, conglomerate, siltstone, volcanic ash, and caliche. The color varies from pink to gray to light brown. The formation is capped by caliche that forms steep slopes. Where the caliche is eroded away, the underlying strata form badlands. The formation is found throughout the Hueco Basin and Mesilla Basin. Outcrops at the Tonuco Uplift northwest of Las Cruces, New Mexico, are unusually well cemented. In the southern Rio Grande rift, the formation contains numerous calcic paleosols (preserved soil layers formed in an arid climate).

The formation is interpreted as fluvial deposits following integration of the ancestral Rio Grande through the region. A piedmont facies is found in addition to the axial river facies in southern New Mexico.

Stable isotope data from the formation is consistent with a gradual warming trend in the latest Pliocene and early Pleistocene, with a generally drier climate but increased summer precipitation.

Fossils
The lower part of the formation contains vertebrate fossils, such as camelids, odd-toed ungulates, Geochelone, and glyptodonts, characteristic of the Aftonian Age. The middle part of the formation contains a bed of the Perlette Ash of late Kansan age. The upper part of the formation east of Las Cruces contains fossil Equus, Mammuthus, and Cuvieronious.

The exposures near Tonuco Mountain (San Diego Mountain) have yielded fossils of the distinctive Tonuco Mountain Local Fauna, of early Blancan age. These include turtles, tortoises, birds, and mammals, including tapirs.

History of investigation
The formation was first named by W.S. Strain in 1966 for exposures near Camp Rice Arroyo in the Rio Grande valley of west Texas. J.W. Hawley and coinvestigators recommended assigning the formation to the Santa Fe Group in 1969.

Because the exposures of the formation in the Jornada del Muerto basin are relatively undisturbed by human activities, they have been used to test models of floodplain development in a tectonically active basin.

See also

 List of fossiliferous stratigraphic units in Texas
 Paleontology in Texas

Notes

References
 
 
 
 
 
 
 
 

Neogene formations of New Mexico
Geologic formations of Texas